Henry Haywood Bell (13 April 1808 – 11 January 1868) was an American admiral in the United States Navy. In the American Civil War, he took part in the liberation of New Orleans and the lower Mississippi. Later he was sent to the Far East to command the East India Squadron. In summer 1867, he led a punitive expedition to avenge the Rover incident, in which he ultimately drowned.

Biography
Bell was born in Orange County, North Carolina. In March 1831, while in Vincennes, Bell was promoted to the rank of Lieutenant. He was assigned to special service on a vessel named Hunter (apparently not part of the U.S. Navy) during the mid-1840s, then was off Africa and in the Mediterranean as an officer of the frigate United States and as commanding officer of the schooner . Between early 1849 and mid-1855, Bell served ashore at the Philadelphia, Norfolk and New York Navy Yards.

Promoted to the rank of commander in August 1854, Bell went to the East Indies in 1855–1858 as commanding officer of the steamer . He spent the late 1850s and early 1860s as a member of the Board of Examiners at the U.S. Naval Academy and on ordnance duty at both Cold Spring, New York and the Washington Navy Yard.

During the Civil War he served as fleet captain of the West Gulf Blockading Squadron under Admiral David Farragut. He served in the series of campaigns that captured New Orleans and gradually opened the Mississippi River for exploitation by Federal forces. In July 1862, while so-engaged, he attained the rank of commodore. After completing his Gulf assignment in 1864, he was assigned to the New York Navy Yard as inspector of ordnance.

With the Civil War at an end, in July 1865 Commodore Bell was sent to the Far East to command the East India (later Asiatic) Squadron. He was advanced to rear admiral a year later and placed on the retired list in April 1867, but remained active as the Asiatic Squadron's commander.

Death
In summer 1867, Rear Admiral Bell led the Formosan Expedition, a punitive operation in response to the  Rover incident, where American sailors had been killed by Taiwanese aborigines. On 11 January 1868, having passed Tempōzan en route upriver, his boat overturned in heavy seas; Bell and all but three of the craft's other occupants perished in this accident.

Namesakes
Two ships, have been named for him.

See also

References

External links
 http://www.history.navy.mil/our-collections/photography/us-people/b/bell-henry-h.html

1808 births
1868 deaths
United States Navy rear admirals (upper half)
Union Navy admirals
People from Orange County, North Carolina
People of North Carolina in the American Civil War
Deaths due to shipwreck at sea